The River Inny is a small river in east Cornwall, United Kingdom.

The River Inny's catchment is 108 square kilometres. Penpont Water is the main tributary and joins the Inny at Two Bridges.

The course of the River Inny is initially east-southeast. From Two Bridges it runs southeast before running due east for the last few miles to its confluence with the Tamar.

The River Inny supports trout, grayling, sea trout and salmon populations. Other wildlife species include the otter, kingfisher, sand martin, dipper, curlew and snipe.

Location 
 Source coordinates   
 Confluence coordinates

References

Rivers of Cornwall
Cornish Killas
1Inny